was an ultra-nationalist political party in Japan.

History
Following a failed attempt to unite the Liberal Party and Rikken Kaishintō, the National Liberal Party was established in October 1890 by five Kyushu-based members of the House of Representatives who had been elected in July. Most of the representatives had previously been members of the Daidō Club. The new party was dissolved the following year.

Election results

References

Defunct political parties in Japan
Political parties established in 1890
1890 establishments in Japan
Political parties disestablished in 1891
1891 disestablishments in Japan